Handlen is a surname. Notable people with the surname include:

Frank Handlen (born 1916), American painter
Richard E. Handlen (1897–1963), American Thoroughbred horse racing trainer

See also
Handley (surname)